National Aviation University (NAU) is a university located in Kyiv, Ukraine. It started in 1933 when the Kyiv Aviation Institute was founded on the basis of the mechanical department of Kyiv Machine-Building Institute. The university consists of five institutes, ten separate faculties, one Aviation Academy (KFA NAU), two lyceums, six colleges and Military Training Department. The university has its own Culture and Arts Center, Aviation Medical Center, Flight Training Center, Training and Sports Wellness Center, Scientific and Technical Library, “Aviator” newspaper and a yacht club. The university also supports the State Aviation Museum.

Main historical dates
 1898 – Mechanical department of Kyiv Polytechnic Institute 
 1933 – Kyiv Aviation Institute
 1947 – Kyiv Institute of Civil Air Fleet
 1965 – Kyiv Institute of Civil Aviation Engineers
 1994 – Kyiv International University of Civil Aviation
 2000 – National Aviation University

Overview
Founded in 1933, over the years of operation, the university has trained over 200,000 professionals.

Today, about 25,000 students are studying in the university, including nearly 1,500 foreigners from 55 countries. NAU incorporates five institutes, ten faculties, military training department, six colleges, two lyceums, and the Flight Academy in Kropyvnytskyi. NAU trains bachelors, masters, candidates, and doctors of science. It became the leading institution for training specialists in civil aviation. The university has scientific schools in the fields of mechanics, management, electronics, materials science, electrical engineering, computer science and computer facilities. Academic activities are performed by a scientific and pedagogical team, including 15 academicians, corresponding members of the Academy of Science of Ukraine, 184 doctors of sciences, professors, 677 candidates of sciences and senior lecturers, 80 honored people in science and engineering of Ukraine and winners of State prizes.

Rector of National Aviation University is a Professor Lutskyi Maksym.

International activities of the university
The university has joined the Bologna Convention that makes it possible for students to get diplomas of international standard and improve students’ mobility. The university professors and students collaborate internationally with universities in Spain, Great Britain, Germany, the Netherlands, France, South Korea and other countries. The university also cooperates with the International Civil Aviation Organization (ICAO). Two ICAO European Regional Training Centers are successfully functioning for aviation personnel training and upgrading.

University facilities

The university occupies a total area of about 90 hectares. There are 14 academic buildings standing on 150 000 square meters.

Within the framework of realization of the state investment project titled “International Pilot Training Center of National Aviation University” the university is successfully establishing high-quality training of pilots.

The K-10 SWIFT, Cessna 172, and four Tecnam 2002 aircraft, as well as the ALSIM aircraft simulator, have been purchased to train Cessna, Tecnam, and Boeing-737 pilots. The scientific and technical library has a resource of about 2,6 million books.

The National Aviation University, the only one in Ukraine, has a unique hangar with 75 airplanes and helicopters, radio equipment, a training aerodrome with aviation ground handling equipment, an aerodynamic training complex equipped with a wind tunnel, and the State Museum of Aviation. Students of the university also have access to the Sports Complex, the Arts and Culture Centre, the Medical Centre, accommodation in one among the 11 hostels, a cafeteria with a seating capacity for 1000 people at a time, memberships in the Billiard Club and e-club, all located within the students' campus.

Structure of the university
More than 25,000 students study at the National Aviation University today, among them 1500 foreign students from more than 55 countries.

The National Aviation University consists of:

Institutes:

 Institute of International Cooperation and Education
 Institute of Innovative Technologies and Leadership
 Educational and Scientific Institute of Continuing Education
 Educational and Scientific Institute of Innovative Educational Technologies
 NAU's ICAO Training Institute

Faculties:

 Aerospace Faculty
 Faculty of Air Navigation, Electronics and Telecommunications
 Faculty of Architecture, Construction and Design
 Faculty of Environmental Safety, Engineering and Technology
 Faculty of Economics and Business Administration
 Faculty of Cybersecurity, Computer and Software Engineering
 Faculty of Linguistics and Social Communications
 Faculty of International Relations
 Faculty of Transport, Management and Logistics
 Law Faculty                    
 Military Training Department

Aviation Academy:

 Kirovograd Flight Academy of National Aviation University (KFA NAU)

Lyceums:

 Aerospace Lyceum
 Higher Vocational School

Colleges:

College of Information Technologies and Land Management
College of Engineering and Management
Slovyansk College
Kryvyi Rih College
Vasylkiv College
Kyiv College of Computer Technology and Economics

12 research institutes and subdivisions: 
Research Institute of Technological Systems within Ministry of Education and Science of Ukraine and; Ministry of Industrial Policy;
Research Institute of Integrated Telecommunication Technologies;
SRI of the Fleeting Processes;
SRI of Design;
SRI "Aviatest";
State Research Institute of Aviation;
Aerospace Center;
Aerodynamic Research Center of National Aviation University of Ukraine;
The Research Design Bureau "Buran";
Center "Air traffic service";
Training Center (gymnasium);
Ukrainian National Research Center of Certification of Combustive-lubricating Materials and Technical Liquids;

Honorable doctors and famous alumni
Olumuyiwa Benard Aliu – President of the ICAO Council 
Pavel Grachev – Defense Minister (Russia)
Borys Paton – President of the National Academy of Sciences of Ukraine
Leonid Kuchma – President of Ukraine
Yang Ho Cho – President and CEO "Korean Airlines" (Korea)
Elizaveta Shahkhatuni, aeronautical engineer and professor
Versand Hakobyan, Armenian oligarch and politician
Ascad Kotayt – President of the ICAO Council
Renato Claudio Costa Pereira – Secretary General of ICAO
Nishikawa Eykiti-Honorary Consul General of Ukraine in Western Japan (Japan)
Song Kyl Hogue – President Hankukskoho Aviation University (Korea)
Eugenio Dominguez Vilches – Rector of the University of Cordoba (Spain)
Krystyan Aegiali – Director of the European and North Atlantic region ICAO
Krivtsov Vladimir S. – President of the National Aerospace University. NE Zhukovsky
Edmundas Zavadskas – Rector of Vilnius Technical University (Lithuania)
Yuri Davydov – President of the National Academy of Applied Sciences (Russia)
Antonio Cuoco – CEO airline "Lufthansa" in Ukraine (Germany)
Inozemtsev Alexander – Director – General Designer of OAO "Avyadvyhatel" (Russia)
Anatoliy P. Shpak – First Vice – President, Chief Scientific Secretary of the Academy of Sciences of Ukraine
Elmar Shryufer – Professor Technical University of Munich (Germany)
Chernomyrdin Viktor Stepanovich – Ambassador Extraordinary and Plenipotentiary of Russia to Ukraine
Mitchell Fox – Head of the Department of ICAO to develop policies and standards for training aviation specialists
Romualdas Mechislavovich Hinyavychyus – Rector of Vilnius Technical University. Gediminas (Lithuania)
Stogniy Boris S. – National Academy of Sciences of Ukraine
Shidlovskii Anatoly Korniyovych – NAS of Ukraine
Pashayev Arif Mir Jalal oglu – Rector of the National Academy of aircraft (Azerbaijan)
Muravchenko Fyodor – General Designer state enterprise "Zaporozhye Machine-Building Design Bureau" Progress "them. Acad. O. Ivanchenko
Troshchenko Valery T. – Director of the Institute for Problems of Strength of. GS Pisarenko Nano
Raymond Benjamin – Secretary General of ICAO
Renat Kuzmin Ravaliyovych – Deputy Prosecutor General of Ukraine
Kremen Vasily – President of the Academy of Pedagogical Sciences of Ukraine

References

External links 
 

Universities and colleges in Kyiv
Educational institutions established in 1933
Technical universities and colleges in Ukraine
1933 establishments in the Soviet Union
Aviation schools in Ukraine
National universities in Ukraine